Delusion Rain is the sixth studio album by the Canadian rock band Mystery, released in November 2015 on Unicorn Digital. The album features a new studio lineup for the band, with guitarist and keyboardist Michel St-Père, keyboardist Benoît Dupuis, bassist François Fournier, guitarist Sylvain Moineau, drummer Jean-Sébastien Goyette, and singer Jean Pageau.

The album also features two guest musicians: Antoine Michaud on guitars who played guitars for Mystery during their 2014 tour and subsequently became their keyboardist in 2016, and Sylvain Descoteaux who is a member of Huis along with St-Père.

Most of the songs on the album were new compositions, with the exception of "The Willow Tree" and "Wall Street King", which originate from around the time of Theatre of the Mind.

The album reached number 20 on the Official Charts Official Progressive Albums Chart Top 30 for the month of December 23, 2015 through January 26, 2016.

The cover art for the album was created by photographer Leszek Bujnowski, who also created the artwork for The World is a Game and Tales from the Netherlands, and is entitled Delusion Rain.

Track listing

Personnel
Mystery
 Jean Pageau - vocals, keyboards, flute
 Michel St-Père - electric and acoustic guitars, keyboards
 Benoît Dupuis - keyboards
 François Fournier - bass guitar, Taurus pedals, keyboards
 Sylvain Moineau - electric guitar, 12 string acoustic guitar
 Jean-Sébastien Goyette - drums

Additional musicians
 Antoine Michaud - guitars
 Sylvain Descôteaux - piano

Release information

References

2015 albums
Mystery (band) albums